Dulce y Picante (Spanish for Sweet and Spicy) is a 1998 album from Alberto Naranjo.

Track listing

Personnel
Alberto Naranjo - arranger, director, drums, timbales
Pablo Ortiz - piano
Jorge Del Pino - bass
Julio Flores, Jorge Rivera, Horacio Mogollón, Evencio Villamizar, Bautista Vivas Chacón - saxes
José Rodríguez, Agustín Valdés, Nelson Contreras, Figueredo Zerpa - trumpets
César Pérez, Gilberto Betancourt, Oscar Mendoza, Antonio Ponte - trombones
Gerardo Rosales - congas
Antonio Rondón - bongo and percussion

Vocals
Juan José Capella (on 10.a, 12.a, 12.c)
Arturo Guaramato (on (3, 10.c, 12.f)
Carlos Espósito (on 6, 10.b, 12.d)
Carlos Daniel Palacios (on 2, 4, 12.b)
Javier Plaza (on 7, 12.e)

Special guests
Graciela Naranjo (vocals on track 13)
Elisa Soteldo (vocals on track 13)

Personnel on track 14 
 Luis Alfonzo Larrain - band leader
Jesús Camacaro and/or Manuel Ramos, Efraín Leal, Luis Moros, César Viera, Rafael Albornoz, Enrique Palau, Joseph Kastz, Germán Muñoz - saxes
Pablo Armitano and/or Cecilio Comprés, Ovidio Palaviccini, Luis Escalante, Pedro Chaparro, Rafael Velásquez, Juan S. Díaz - trumpets
Marcos Ramos or Leopoldo Escalante, Filiberto Meléndez - trombone
José Luis Paz or René Urbino, Willy Pérez - piano
Antonio Ramos or Enrique Hernández, Alvaro Alvarez - bass
George Lister or Francisco Hernández - drums
Pedro Jeanton or José Rojas - congas
Alfonso Contramaestre or Francisco Segovia - bongo

Vocals on track 14
Celia Cruz (a)
Tony Camargo (b)
Luisín Landáez (d)

Notes
Tracks 1 through 13 were recorded between February  and April 1998
Songs included on track 14 were recorded in 1948 (a), 1952 (b), 1955 (c/d) and 1956 (e)

Production
Date of Recording: February - April 1998.
Place of Recording: Caracas, Venezuela
Mixing: Darío Peñaloza
Label: Roberto Obeso & Federico Pacanins
ID: 0004-98

Alberto Naranjo albums
1998 albums